Carettochelyidae is a family of cryptodiran turtles belonging to the Trionychia. It contains only a single living species, the pig-nosed turtle (Carettochelys insculpta) native to New Guinea and Northern Australia. Stem-group carettochelyids are known from the Cretaceous of Asia, with the family being widely distributed across North America, Europe and Asia during the Paleogene.

Taxonomy
After Joyce, 2014 unless otherwise noted.

 Stem group taxa (also known as Pan-Carettochelys Joyce, Parham and Gauthier 2004)
 Kizylkumemys Nessov, 1976
 Kizylkumemys khoratensis Tong et al., 2005 Khok Kruat Formation, Thailand, Early Cretaceous (Aptian)
 Kizylkumemys schultzi Nessov, 1976 Khodzhakul Formation, Uzbekistan, Late Cretaceous (Cenomanian)
 Indeterminate fragments of stem-Carretochelyids are also known from the Cenomanian aged Bayan Shireh Formation, Mongolia
 Carettochelyidae Gill, 1889
 Anosteira Leidy, 1871
 Anosteira manchuriana Zangerl, 1947 Liaoning, China, late Eocene
 Anosteira maomingensis Chow and Liu, 1955 Youkanwo Formation, Guangdong, China, Late Eocene
 Anosteira mongoliensis Gilmore, 1931 Inner Mongolia, China, Late Eocene-Oligocene
 Anosteira ornata Leidy, 1871 Bridger Formation, Wyoming, USA, Early Eocene
 Anosteira pulchra (Clark, 1932) Uinta Formation, Utah, USA, Middle Eocene (Lutetian)
 An indeterminate carettochelyid is also known from the Early Eocene (Lutetian) aged Kuldana Formation, Khyber Pakhtunkhwa, Pakistan given the name Chorlakkichelys shahi Broin, 1987
 Carettochelyinae Williams, 1950
 Allaeochelys Noulet, 1867
 Allaeochelys crassesculpta (Harrassowitz, 1922) Messel Pit, Germany, Early Eocene
 Allaeochelys delheidi (Dollo, 1886) Brussels Formation, Belgium, Zamora, Spain, Early Eocene Headon Hill Formation, England, Late Eocene (Priabonian)
 Allaeochelys libyca Havlik et al, 2014, Al Wahat District, Libya, middle Miocene (Langhian)
 Allaeochelys lingnanica (Young and Chow, 1962) Shaoguan, Guangdong, China early Paleogene (possibly Paleocene)
 Allaeochelys magnifica (=Burmemys magnifica Hutchison et al., 2004)  Pandaung Formation, Myanmar, Late Eocene (Bartonian)
 Allaeochelys parayrei Noulet, 1867 Tarn, Toulouse, France, Late Eocene (Bartonian)
Allaeochelys liliae Carbot-Chanona et al. 2020 Mazantic Shale, Chiapas, Mexico, Early Miocene (Aquitanian)
 Carettochelys Ramsay, 1886 Northern Australia, New Guinea, Recent
 Indeterminate carettochelyids are also known from the uppermost Miocene to lowermost Pliocene of Victoria, Australia, As well as the Upper Miocene of New Guinea.

References

Trionychia
Turtle families